In modern American beekeeping, a Langstroth hive is any vertically modular beehive that has the key features of vertically hung frames, a bottom board with entrance for the bees, boxes containing frames for brood and honey (the lowest box for the queen to lay eggs, and boxes above where honey may be stored) and an inner cover and top cap to provide weather protection. In a Langstroth hive, the bees build honeycomb into frames, which can be moved with ease. The frames are designed to prevent bees from attaching honeycombs where they would either connect adjacent frames, or connect frames to the walls of the hive. The movable frames allow the beekeeper to manage the bees in a way which was formerly impossible.

Modern Langstroth hives have different dimensions from L. L. Langstroth's beehive that was originally patented in 1852 and manufactured until approximately 1920, but retain the main features of allowing bee space as well as easy access which works well for the bees but also makes management of the beehive easier for the beekeeper.

The standard beehive used in many parts of the world for beekeeping is based on the Langstroth hive.

History 

Before the dimensions of bee space were discovered, bees were mostly hived in skeps (conical straw baskets) or gums (hollowed-out logs which approximated the natural dwellings of bees), or in box hives (a thin-walled wooden box with no internal structure).

This measurement is called bee space.

During the summer of 1851, Langstroth applied the concept to keeping the lid free on a top-bar hive, but in autumn of the same year, he realized that the bee space could be applied to a newly designed frame which would prevent the bees from attaching honeycomb to the inside of the hive box. Attaching comb to the hive wall was a difficulty with frameless designs, such as Dzierżon's frameless movable-comb hive (1835). US Patent 9300 was issued to Langstroth on October 5, 1852, and remained valid despite numerous attempts to challenge it based on its alleged use of prior art.

Langstroth made many other discoveries in beekeeping and contributed greatly to the industrialization of modern beekeeping.

Other inventors, notably François Huber in 1789, had designed hives with frames (the so-called  or book hive), but Langstroth's hive was a practical movable frame hive, which overcame the tendency of the bees to fill empty spaces with comb and to cement smaller spaces together with propolis. In contrast to August von Berlepsch's frame-movable side-opened hive (May 1852, Germany), Langstroth's hive was top-opened, as was the Bevan top-bar hive (1848, UK). These combined adaptations led to the Langstroth hive design being preferred by beekeepers over all others, and variations on his hive are used throughout the world.

Langstroth subsequently published a book called A Practical Treatise on the Hive and Honey-Bee, nowadays commonly known as The Hive and the Honey Bee or, under the title with which it was re-issued in 2004, as Langstroth's Hive and the Honey-Bee: The Classic Beekeeper's Manual. In this book, Langstroth described the proper dimensions and use of the modern beehive as we know it today. Langstroth's book went through several editions until about 1900, but in all of them the hive that is illustrated is the same as the original design.

Bee space
A dimension of 7 ± 2 mm ( or roughly ) is nowadays the usual size meant when bee space is referred to. This setup has been established for the brood chamber, as for honey storage the comb distance can be different. 

Dr. Jan Dzierżon, a Polish apiarist, had in the year 1835 determined the correct spacing for the top-bars in beehives. In this case, the distance between combs is 
; that is, twice the medium bee space of 
. 
Later, in 1848, Dzierżon introduced grooves into his hives' side walls, to replace the strips of wood that the top-bars had earlier been hung from.

In Europe, both Dzierżon and fellow apiarist Baron August von Berlepsch had been focused on side-opened hives. Land resources for beekeeping was limited, and traditionally multiple bee hives had been kept in a single beehouse. The so-called bee space had been incorporated by Berlepsch into his frame arrangement (Bienen-Zeitung, May 1852) following Dzierżon's discovery that grooves added to inner walls remained free of propolis (1848). Thus, the correct distance between frame side-bar and hive wall was already understood by some European beekeepers before 1851.

Langstroth's patent of 5 October 1852 adopted  −the upper limit of the bee space, slightly larger than optimal− between the side bars of a frame and hive wall, and also reserved rights to use the distance  between top-bars and inner cover, the latter of which represents a gap larger than optimal. The term 'bee space' was coined later than Langstroth's 1852 patent.

Langstroth had been aware of Dzierżon's discoveries before he submitted his patent application. Langstroth expressed great respect for Jan Dzierżon, saying that "No words can express the absorbing interest with which I devoured this work. I recognized at once its author as the Great Master of modern apiculture".

Design 

The original Langstroth hive had a portico entrance, integrated floor and non-removable brood box, a single removable honey box (using the same frame size as the brood box) that sat inside an outer box that extended from the brood box, and a hinged roof.

Langstroth constructed his hives so that the frames, in which the bees were to make their combs, could easily be separated from all adjacent parts of the hive — the walls of the hive, the floor of the hive, the cover of the hive, and other frames within the hive. To extract a frame from such a hive will not require any comb to be cut. Usually the most trouble a beekeeper encounters in removing a frame from such a hive results from the bees using propolis to bond frames to the brackets they rest upon. Being able to remove and replace combs so easily makes it possible, and practical, for beekeepers to inspect all of their hives on a regular basis. Such inspections, to check for signs of disease and/or parasites, imminent swarming, an aging queen, and other conditions requiring intervention, are essential to successful bee husbandry.

The Langstroth bee hive is made up from top to bottom of:

 telescoping cover or migratory cover
 inner cover
 one or more hive bodies or honey supers made of wood, polystyrene, or other plastic
 (optional) queen excluder between brood box and honey supers
 eight to ten frames, made of wood or plastic, per hive body or honey super
 (optional) foundation made of wax and wires or plastic
 bottom board, with optional entrance reducer

Outer cover 
The outer cover is a wooden or polystyrene cover that fits on the top of the hive. In higher latitudes (further north in the Northern Hemisphere; further south in the Southern Hemisphere), a cover which telescopes down around the inner cover and an inch or so down over the top super, called a telescoping cover, is usually used. Many commercial beekeepers use what is known as a migratory cover, a solid cover which does not extend beyond the sides of a hive body.

Inner cover 
The inner cover provides a barrier between the telescoping cover and the bees. In more temperate climates, a plastic foil may be used as an inner cover. Plastic foil should not be used to winter bees under, as trapped condensation would cause the hive to become wet, and bees can be lost due to freezing when temperatures fall during the night. In areas with a hot summer, a solid inner cover with a communication hole provides dead-air space for insulation against both heat and cold. This prevents the bees from gluing the top cover to the top bars of the super under it. When an inner cover is used, the top cover is more easily removed from the hive. Notches in the frame of the solid inner cover and telescoping cover can serve as an upper entrance for the bees. A communication hole in the middle allows bees to reach emergency food placed above by the beekeeper if it becomes required.

Hive body and hive super 
Hive bodies and hive supers are rectangular boxes with standardised inside dimensions to take standardized frames. However, there are regional and brand differences. Outside box dimensions vary depending on the type of material used; for example polystyrene foam boxes have much larger outside dimensions than boxes made out of wood.

Three heights of boxes are standard: Deep, Medium and Shallow. Deep and medium hive bodies are used for the brood chamber. Medium and shallow supers are used for honey stores. The frames holding combs have top bars that hang on rabbeted slots or rails along the upper sides of a box.

The deep hive body is normally used only for brood. If it becomes filled with honey, it becomes too heavy to handle manually. Shallow supers are not ideal for the brood chamber of the hive because the bees need to form a single compact sphere during the cold winter months — a sphere that can expand and contract without being divided by a horizontal plane in the middle caused by the gaps between combs in multiple hive bodies. Commercial operations usually use one or two deep hive bodies for brood, and additional shallow boxes for honey supers. Some hobbyists prefer to standardise on two "medium" boxes. There's also a continental deep hive body called jumbo that allows for Dadant sized big brood frames 

The hive body or hive super holds 8 to 10 frames that are standardized in length. The frames hold the foundation and the honeycomb that is built on it.

Hive equipment manufacturers will often produce bodies and supers that vary slightly. The differences between manufacturers are generally  or less. The following table includes interior dimensions and volumes for the 5, 8, and 10 frame shallow, medium, and deep bodies/supers.

Frames 

Movable frames hold bee-combs, the furniture of a hive. They enable a great deal of hive management: inspection and harvest become both easier and less destructive of bees and beekeepers. In winter, bees sometimes can become so cold they are unable to move to the other side of a hive, and so beekeepers often prepare hives for winter by moving all the honey together. Movable standard frames also permit transfer of combs of honey, pollen or brood from a healthy hive to a failing hive. This practice is a mode of transfer of pests and diseases more effectively, that has haunted modern beekeeping since its introduction. Brood transfer even lets workers replace a dead queen by feeding royal jelly to the new brood.

Langstroth frames are usually oriented "the cold way", by permitting a draft from the entrance to move through the brood chamber. However, this provides more direct paths from the entrance to the combs. In his book, Langstroth said that he chose this orientation by observing bees' preferences when building comb in box hives.

Modern beekeepers buy three sizes of standardized Langstroth frames to fit the three depths of standardized Langstroth supers. Frames are inexpensively mass-produced. Most beekeepers find it uneconomical to make frames themselves. The woodwork is too intricate and repetitive without specialized tooling.

Since the frame might touch both honey and bees, frames are usually made from inexpensive, nontoxic softwoods such as eastern pine. Plastic frames are also available.

When new frames are installed, they are filled with "foundation," artificial comb made of recycled natural beeswax or plastic. Beeswax foundation usually requires support from metal wires threaded through a frame. Foundation is widely used because bees make wax from carbohydrates that would otherwise be used to make honey.

The use of recycled beeswax concerns beekeepers because it can transmit diseases, such as American Foulbrood. Some beekeepers, such as Christy Hemenway, have said that they believe that insecticides can be concentrated in the recycled wax, harming bees' health.

The frames in the Langstroth patent were not designed to use foundation. The top bars of the patent Langstroth frames were "comb guides," 60-degree triangular prisms of wood pointing downwards. These encourage the bees to construct new comb along the edge of the prism, within the frames. Some beekeepers today practice foundationless beekeeping.

Bottom board and entrance reducer 
The bottom board is almost always exterior-grade plywood, to resist water damage. It keeps dampness and some pests out of the lower brood chamber. It rests on wooden rails, which in turn rest on the ground. Some beekeepers place the rails on bricks or sand to reduce water and termite damage. Langstroth's patent shows a wooden hive stool that lifts the hive several feet from the ground, to a convenient working height for a beekeeper.

A white plastic sheet is sometimes coated with a slightly sticky substance, and slid over the bottom board to trap and count fallen varroa mites, a bee parasite that can infest hives.

The entrance reducer is a square bar of wood to help the bees manage air circulation. Bees naturally manage their hive's temperature with fanning, clustering and shivering. The reducer helps bees stay warm in winter, and fan less energetically in summer. It may drop into notches in the wooden rails or the bottom board. It has two different-sizes of bee entrance notches cut into it, on different sides of the bar. In winter, the reducer is turned so that the smallest notch forms the entrance. This reduces the air flow and helps the bees to keep the hive warm. In spring and fall, it is turned so that the larger notch forms the entrance. In hot weather, or full nectar season the entire reducer can be removed to help cool the hive and permit more traffic to the fields.

In winter when the bees are too slow-moving to defend the hive, the entrance reducer may be supplemented with a mouse barrier to keep mice out of the hive.

Modern hives usually extend the bottom board slightly beyond the entrance to form a landing area, so that in nectar season, larger numbers of bees can land and walk into the hive. Langstroth's patent supplemented this with a cloth landing area supported on two wooden arms.

In Langstroth's patent, although the hive as a whole was level, the bottom board was slightly tilted toward the entrance so that liquid water would run out of the hive. The tilt also helped the bees to push dirt, debris and dead bees out of the hive entrance. Modern commercial hives usually have level bottom boards.

Langstroth's patent entrance included two traps designed to attract wax moths away from the bee entry. These were loosely mounted so that a beekeeper could remove and destroy wax moth larvae and pupae.

Specialty parts 
The Cloake board, also known as the "bottom-without-a-bottom", is a specialty piece of hive equipment that is installed between two hive bodies of the brood nest. It allows the beekeeper to insert a sliding metal or wood panel, which will split the hive into two parts without having to lift the hive boxes, the objective being to split a single hive into two independent hives.

The queen excluder is a mesh grid, usually made of wire or plastic, sized such that worker bees can pass through, but queens (generally) cannot. When used, it is generally placed between the hive body and the honey supers. The purpose of the queen excluder is to keep the queen from laying eggs in the honey supers, which can lead to darker honey and can also complicate extraction. Many beekeepers reject the use of queen excluders, however, claiming that they create a barrier for workers and result in lower levels of honey collection and storage.

A feeder is most often used to feed granulated sugar or sugar syrup at times of the year when natural nectar sources are not enough for the hive's needs. There are various styles. Division board feeders have a shape similar to that of the frame, and hang inside the hive body in the same manner as a frame. Entrance feeders are wedged into the hive entrance on the bottom board with an inverted container of feed. Hive-top feeders have the same footprint as the hive body and are placed on top of the hive, but underneath the telescoping cover. Other hive-top feeders consist of an inverted container with small holes in the lid, which are placed either directly on top of the frames, or on top of the hole in the inner cover.

When harvesting honey or maintaining the supers, an "escape board" or (British) "clearing board" is placed between the brood boxes and the supers to get most of the bees out of the supers. The escape board lets bees exit the supers into other areas of the hive, but makes it difficult for the bees to re-enter the supers. There are many different designs.

Patents 

  USPatent|9300—L.L. Langstroth's patent for a Bee hive from Oct. 5, 1852
 USPatent|9300—L.L. Langstroth's patent for a Bee hive Reissued from May 26, 1863

See also 
 Amos Root
 BS National Beehive

References

External links

Beehives